Óscar Barrena González (born 22 October 1966 in Kirchheim-Teck, West Germany) is a former field hockey player from Spain. He won the silver medal with the men's national team at the 1996 Summer Olympics in Atlanta, Georgia.

References
Spanish Olympic Committee

External links
 

1966 births
Living people
People from Santander, Spain
Sportspeople from Cantabria
People from Kirchheim unter Teck
Sportspeople from Stuttgart (region)
Spanish male field hockey players
Olympic field hockey players of Spain
Olympic silver medalists for Spain
Field hockey players at the 1996 Summer Olympics
Olympic medalists in field hockey
Medalists at the 1996 Summer Olympics
20th-century Spanish people